Michaela Alica Breeze  (born 17 May 1979) is a British former weightlifter.  Breeze was born in Watford and raised in Cornwall and educated at Wadebridge School. She started weightlifting under the guidance of PE teacher Dave Allen. Breeze then went on to Bodmin Community College before attending the University of Wales Institute, Cardiff. 
Breeze is well known for commentating at various events including Rio Olympics and Tokyo Olympics.

After nearly eighteen months of starting weightlifting she was put in touch with a new coach, Ken Price. She sustained a back injury in 2000, which saw her miss international competition and training for over a year.

After taking a silver at the 2010 Commonwealth Games, Breeze retired from the sport and opened a gym in Aberdare. However, she made a comeback for the 2014 Commonwealth Games, motivated by a desire to push athletes she was coaching towards qualifying for the Games themselves. Breeze won a bronze medal in the 58 kg competition, setting a new Commonwealth Games snatch record and subsequently announced her second retirement.

Breeze also taught PE at Ivybridge Community College in Devon. She was appointed Member of the Order of the British Empire (MBE) in the 2011 Birthday Honours for services to weightlifting.

Major results

Career achievements
 Bronze medal in the Clean and Jerk at the World Junior Championships held in Savannah, USA in 1999.
 Winning the European Junior title in Poland in 1999.
 Gold in the snatch and silvers in the Clean and Jerk and combined total at the 2002 Commonwealth Games in Manchester.
 Bronze medal in the 58 kg class at the European Senior Championships in Greece in 2003.
 9th position in the 58 kg class of the 2004 Summer Olympics.
 Gold medal in the 2006 Commonwealth Games.
 10th position in the 63 kg category at the 2007 World Weightlifting Championships.
 5th position in the 63 kg category at the 2008 European Weightlifting Championships.
 14th position in the 63 kg category of the 2008 Summer Olympics.
 Won a silver medal at 2010 Commonwealth Games held in Delhi, India in the Women's 63 kg Category.
 Won a bronze medal at 2014 Commonwealth Games held in Glasgow, Scotland.

Personal life

Breeze married Welsh netball representative Sinead Kelly in May 2015.

Notes and references

External links 

 Interview for BBC Sport
 Profile for Athens 2004
 Athlete Biography at beijing2008

1979 births
Welsh female weightlifters
Sportspeople from Watford
Commonwealth Games gold medallists for Wales
Commonwealth Games silver medallists for Wales
Olympic weightlifters of Great Britain
Weightlifters at the 2002 Commonwealth Games
Weightlifters at the 2004 Summer Olympics
Weightlifters at the 2006 Commonwealth Games
Weightlifters at the 2008 Summer Olympics
Weightlifters at the 2010 Commonwealth Games
Weightlifters at the 2014 Commonwealth Games
People from Wadebridge
Alumni of Cardiff Metropolitan University
Living people
Members of the Order of the British Empire
Commonwealth Games bronze medallists for Wales
Commonwealth Games medallists in weightlifting
LGBT weightlifters
European Weightlifting Championships medalists
Medallists at the 2002 Commonwealth Games
Medallists at the 2006 Commonwealth Games
Medallists at the 2010 Commonwealth Games
Medallists at the 2014 Commonwealth Games